Suez Governorate is one of the governorates of Egypt. It is located in the north-eastern part of the country and is coterminous with the city of Suez. It is situated north of the Gulf of Suez.

Municipal divisions
The governorate is divided into the following municipal divisions for administrative purposes, with a total estimated population as of July 2017 of 730,759.

Population
According to population estimates, in 2015 all 622,859 residents of the governorate lived in urban areas. With an urbanization rate of 100% the Suez Governorate is one of the most urbanized in the country, along with Cairo and Port Said.

Industrial zones
According to the Egyptian Governing Authority for Investment and Free Zones (GAFI), in affiliation with the Ministry of Investment (MOI), the following industrial zones are located in this governorate:
The industrial zone for light industries
 North Ataka heavy industrial zone
 West ataka heavy industrial zone
(New urban community industrial zones) Ataka and its expansions
(New urban community industrial zones) South of the Sumed - Petrochemicals

In mid-2018 an agreement was made between Russia and Egypt for the development of a Russian Industrial Zone.

Ports
There are five ports in the Suez Governorate; namely El-Sokhna port, Tewfiq port, Adabeya port, petrol basin port, and El-Atka fishing port.

Natural resources
Natural resources in the Suez Governorate include limestone, clay, coal, petroleum, marble, and lime.

Exports
The chief exports of Suez are papayas.

Tourist attractions

Ein El-Sokhna, a well known recreational and medical destination.
Moses' springs
Judaic Hill at El-Khoor

Public Free Zone
In 1975, the Suez Public Free Zone was established. It is divided between two main locations: Port Tewfik and Adabeya.

See also 
 Suez Canal
 Suez crisis

References

External links
عدد سكـــــــــــان المحافظات الآن 
Official website
Ministry of Trade and Industry Free Zones site
 El Wattan News of Suez Governorate

 
Governorates of Egypt
Governorate, Suez Governorate
Red Sea
Year of establishment missing